Laëtitia Hubert (born 23 June 1974) is a French former competitive figure skater. She is the 1997 Trophée Lalique champion, the 1992 World Junior champion, and a two-time French national senior champion (1998–1999). She competed in four Winter Olympic Games (1992, 1994, 1998, and 2002) and placed as high as fourth at the World Championships (1992 and 1998).

Personal life 
Hubert was born on 23 June 1974 in Paris and married in summer 2000.

Career 
Hubert began skating at the age of three years. She finished 21st in her World Championship debut in 1990. The following year, at the 1991 World Championships, she had a rough collision with Midori Ito of Japan during the short program warmup.

In the 1991–92 season, Hubert won the World Junior title and later took silver behind Surya Bonaly at the French National Championships. This finish earned her a trip to the 1992 Winter Olympics in Albertville. At this time she was working on her triple lutz jump but elected to do a triple loop jump during her Olympic short program where she placed fifth. She was the last skater of the evening in the long program, where she placed fifteenth after making numerous errors, including falling four times. This dropped her to twelfth place overall. Hubert competed at the 1992 World Championships one month later. She had two falls but completed six triples, including a triple flip jump and a triple/triple combination. Her third place in the free skate, combined with fifth in the short, resulted in fourth overall, her career-best World result. Hubert matched that result in 1998, with the next-best result, sixth, occurring in 1995 and 1997.

Hubert won the 1997 Trophée Lalique, edging out 1998 Olympic gold medalist Tara Lipinski for first place. She also won the French title in 1998 and 1999.

Hubert had many knee and foot injuries, resulting in her missing most of the 1999–2000 season. She retired from competition following the 2001–02 season. She performed at the 2011 Caesars Tribute Show.

Programs

Competitive highlights 
GP: Champions Series / Grand Prix

References

External links 
 
 
 
 

1974 births
Figure skaters from Paris
Olympic figure skaters of France
Figure skaters at the 1992 Winter Olympics
Figure skaters at the 1994 Winter Olympics
Figure skaters at the 1998 Winter Olympics
Figure skaters at the 2002 Winter Olympics
French female single skaters
Living people
World Junior Figure Skating Championships medalists
Competitors at the 1998 Goodwill Games